Charles Fazzino is an American pop artist, known for his silkscreen serigraphs in a 3D pop art style. His artwork incorporates influence from urban landscapes, sporting events, and modern celebrities.
As described in the book about Fazzino titled The Master of 3-D Pop Art, "An innovative and imaginative storyteller, Charles Fazzino serves up a bevy of details in his unique three-dimensional creations. His collectors marvel as much at his ability to capture the entire essence of his subject matter in one statement, as they do at his use of vibrant colors, his whimsical sense of humor, and his hand-assembled multi-layered artistic style. Although, the snappy titled often gives a clue to the content of each painting, it can take years of careful observation to discern all of the details in a single Fazzino image. One of Fazzino's greatest joys is to observe visitors at exhibition of his work. 'I love to watch the smiles form as people begin to recognize elements of my paintings,' comments Fazzino. 'They point at the images as if inserting themselves into the stories. I watch that and I'm reminded of why i paint. It's all about celebrating the joy and fun we have as human beings on this planet."

Background

Born in 1955, Charles Fazzino is the son of a Finnish sculptor (Irene) and an Italian mode shoe designer (Salvatore). He took his first formal art class as a 7th grader in 1967 and later graduated from the School of Visual Arts in Manhattan in 1977 with a degree in Bachelor of Arts.

Today, Fazzino's artwork is sold and exhibited in galleries, museums, and art shows in more than 20 countries worldwide. A majority of his event-specific artwork for major events represents The Super Bowl, The Grammy Awards, The Pori Jazz Festival, Major League Baseball All-Star Game, and the Daytime Emmy Awards.

Fazzino is most well known for the three-dimensionality of his silkscreen serigraphs. While exhibiting in the juried arts fairs in Florida in 1980, Fazzino attended a 3-D paper tole class in an arts supply store. He experimented with the technique and showed his first three-dimensional print at the Greenwich Village Art Show in New York City that May. Fazzino entered the gallery circuit when he sold his first 3D offset lithographs to a gallery in Michigan. He began using the silkscreen printing process in 1986.

The Fazzino 3D process 
Fazzino's three-dimensional creations are labor-intensive, which require several stages to complete. The artist begins with a sketch of a flat concept idea that is illustrated and re-worked by Freelance illustration artists under his guidance for weeks or even months before the limited edition process even begins.. The flat artwork is sent to a Digital printer for reproduccion. The flat sheets return to Fazzino's studio where more than 40 freelance artists who complete the laborious 3D process work at home, all handcut with an Xacto knife, to cut out the elements from cutout sheets and mount them onto heavier boards using Silicone glue to raise and create the 3D layered effect. Fazzino often equates the process of building up the layers of artwork to "layering it like a lasagna." The 3D artworks are finished off by hand with glitter and Swarovski crystals.

Special event commissions 

NFL Super Bowl

Charles Fazzino's art has been featured in every Super Bowl for the National Football League since the 2001 Super Bowl XXXV in Tampa Bay, Florida.

Fazzino was profiled by CBS News Sunday Morning with Charles Osgood on Charles Osgood Sunday in New Orleans, Louisiana on February 3, 2013. He also created a painting for Super Bowl XLVIII in 2014, where the Seattle Seahawks defeated the Denver Broncos at MetLife Stadium, as well as The New England Patriots 2015 win in Super Bowl XLIX in Phoenix, Arizona.

Fazzino's licensed commemorative painting for Super Bowl LI in Houston, Texas, valued at $15,000 UDS, was unveiled at a private reception. The painting was later auctioned off and proceeds were donated to the WithMerci Foundation.

During the week leading up to Super Bowl LIII in Atlanta, Charles Fazzino appeared in a segment for Inside Edition.com during which he was interviewed by the program's guest Super Bowl correspondent Kelleth Cuthbert, aka the Fiji Water Girl.

Fazzino commemorated his twentieth Super Bowl for the National Football League during Super Bowl LIV in Miami. The artist appeared at The Seminole Hard Rock Hotel & Casino and at the Super Bowl Experience in the Miami Beach Convention Center alongside former NY Giant Mathias Kiwanuka and Miami Dolphin Davon Godchaux.

Major League Baseball All-Star Game

Fazzino has created artwork for more thirteen Major League Baseball All-Star Games. In 2014, when the All-Star Game was in Minneapolis, he partnered with The Minnesota Twins Community Foundation to donate artwork and raise funds to support the charity's mission.

2016 All-Star Game in San Diego 
2018 All-Star Game in Washington DC 
2019 All-Star Game in Cleveland 
2021 All-Star Game in Denver 
2022 All-Star Game in Los Angeles 

Little League Baseball

Fazzino was commissioned to create the official artwork for the 75th Anniversary of Little League Baseball. As part of the project, he spent several days in Williamsport in February 2014, conducting educational workshops for students and teachers. The resulting work was exhibited during the World Series at the Gallery at Penn College. Fazzino's official art was also unveiled during the series and installed in the World of Little League Museum.

Daytime Emmy Awards

2007 Daytime Emmy Awards 
2008 Daytime Emmy Awards 
2011 Daytime Emmy Awards 

Grammy Awards

2004 Grammy Awards - Fazzino created the official artwork for the 46th annual Grammy Awards. He joined the ranks of artists such as world-renowned architect Frank Gehry, Photographer/Filmmaker David LaChapelle, and Mosaic Artist Roy Feinson, who have all been commissioned by the Academy before and since.

United States Olympic Committee

2016 - Rio Summer Olympics 
2013 - Warrior Games - Fazzino commissioned by the United States Olympic Committee to create the official artwork for the 2013 Warrior Games. The Games are an annual competition between wounded warriors from each of the military services and from the UK.

Theater

Fazzino's foray into the theater came in 2012 when he collaborated with the producers of The Ride. The Fazzino Ride was an interactive tour of Manhattan designed by Fazzino and Ride producer Richard Humphrey. The innovative tour bus featured Fazzino's artwork on the outside and on high definition monitors on the inside. The experience — part tourist attraction and part performance art — took riders on an adventure through the streets of Manhattan as experienced through Fazzino's 3D pop art world. In the end, The Fazzino Ride was nominated for a 2013 Drama Desk Award for Unique Theatrical Experience.

Winterfest Boat Parade

Charles Fazzino was commissioned to create the official artwork for the 50th anniversary of the Fort Lauderdale Winterfest Boat Parade.

Toys for Tots

Secretary of the Navy Carlos Del Toro unveiled Charles Fazzino's official artwork for the 75th anniversary of the US Corps. Reserve Toys for Tots in 2022.

Major works and public installations
JFK International Airport Collection for American Airlines at Terminal 8: The collection includes a 6' by 7' rotating 3D sculpture of an American Airlines plane entitled From New York...to the World and a 13' three-dimensional mural and mobile that welcomes travelers to New York City as they travel down to baggage claim.

 2016 Westchester Medical Center commissioned Charles Fazzino to decorate the outside of their Mobile Health Coach.
 2018 Stamford, CT commissioned Fazzino to paint outdoor kiosks 
 2018 The city of New Rochelle, New York commissioned Charles Fazzino and his artist daughter Heather Fazzino to create and unveil the first of a series of public sculptures installed around the city to promote the "Ideally Yours" campaign.
 2018 NBC Sports commissioned Charles Fazzino to create an artwork celebrating their historical achievement of NBC Sunday Night Football becoming the number one show in prime time for seven consecutive years. Charles Fazzino, along with NBC Sports Chairman Mark Lazarus and Sunday Night Football director Fred Gaudelli unveiled the work at the network's NBC Headquarters in Stamford, Connecticut.
 2019 Fazzino was commissioned to create two 16-foot tall steel sculptures, two indoor murals, and a seating area for Fiesta, a new state-of-the-art shopping mall in Busan, Korea.

Museum installations and exhibitions 

In 2010–2011, Fazzino hosted a major museum exhibition titled "The Faces of Fort Lauderdale" at the Museum of Art | Fort Lauderdale. The exhibition celebrated the 100-year history of the area and Fazzino contributed to it in his role as the official artist for the centennial celebration.

Fazzino's first major museum exhibition in Germany took place from April 27 through June 22 at the International Academy of Art in Hembach. The district of Kreis Duren invited the artist to exhibit at the Academy and commissioned him to create an edition of artwork titled "For the Love of Kreis Düren".

In 2015, Fazzino was chosen to participate in a group show at the Coral Springs Museum of Art in Florida. The show, titled "The Art of Pop & Comics" featured eight pieces by Fazzino, including a tribute to the Masters titled "A Cartoon Celebration of the Masters," in which Fazzino weaves popular cartoon characters into pieced-together scenes by masters such as Vincent Van Gogh, Leonardo da Vinci, Edvard Munch, and Jackson Pollock. "This is a tribute piece," said Fazzino. "The paintings I chose from the Masters are so incredibly recognizable, as are the characters now interwoven throughout them. It's a meeting of two worlds with two different languages that come together in this one, intricately assembled, composition."

In 2015, Fazzino was commissioned create an artwork celebrating the 50th Anniversary of Singapore. He made his debut in the country in May 2015 to unveil the work and participate in several receptions and a media tour.

In 2017, Holocaust Memorial and Tolerance Center of Nassau County opened a Fazzino exhibit in their museum titled "The Heroes of the Holocaust," featuring several new original works, and a series of plexiglass sculptures paying tribute to those who saved the lives of Jews during and after World War II. The limited edition artwork created specifically for the exhibit, "After the Darkness" was unveiled by Dani Dayan, Counsel General of Israel in New York. "Tackling a project of this magnitude and intensity was very difficult for me because of all the sadness associated with this horrific time period," said Fazzino. "My artwork tends to be bright, colorful, and uplifting. People say it makes them happy. But then I discovered all of these incredible people…everyday people who sacrificed their own lives and the lives of their family members to save others. Their stories are inspiring. I really felt that given the current political climate in our country, it's even more important for people to remember what happened. And my mission is to document not only the thousands of heroic acts that took place, but also the hope and the resilience of the Jewish people. This exhibit celebrates the ability of the people of our world to survive a horror like the Holocaust and in the end, become even stronger and more full of hope and love than they were before."

In 2021, Charles Fazzino was commissioned by the National September 11 Museum & Memorial to create an image in tribute to the 20th anniversary of the World Trade Center terrorist attacks. The artwork was unveiled in a ceremony at the Museum with Anthoula Katsimatides, 9/11 Family Member; Joseph Esposito, Former Chief of Department, NYPD; Salvatore Cassano, Former Commissioner, FDNY; Salvatore Carcaterra, Former, Deputy Chief, NYPD; and San Panchal, Former 1st Grade Detective & 9/11 Hero, NYPD, Bernie Williams, Retired NY Yankee, Pete Alonso, NY Met.

Global exhibits and appearances 
Fazzino's work is exhibited in many countries around the world, including:
Denmark
Dubai
Finland
2009 - Official Artist Pori Jazz Festival in Pori, Finland
France
2013 - The official artist for the annual Foie de Lyon festival in Lyon, France.
Germany
India
2015 Joint Exhibition with Dudu Gerstein (David) at Habitat Centre in New Delhi
Japan
Luxembourg
Singapore
Spain
Switzerland
South Korea
Korean International Art Fair, 2016-2019
United States
3D Studio Gallery, Santa Barbara, CA 
Ocean Galleries, Stone Harbor, NJ,
Wentworth Galleries in Atlanta, GA; Boca Raton, FL; Hollywood, FL; Fort Lauderdale, FL Short Hills, NJ; Alexandria, VA; Bethesda, MD; King of Prussia, PA 
Art One Gallery, Hollywood, CA
Barker Animation, Cheshire, CT

Books written about or by Fazzino 
June Vollman, Andrea Ruoff-Appel, Shari Ruoff & Charles Fazzino: Regards From Broadway Andrea Ruoff Art Associates, 1991, 
Heike Theuerkauf, Charles Fazzino, Marshall Lee, Phillip Davies: Charles Fazzino. Balance House, 1996, 
Julie Maner, Charles Fazzino: Charles Fazzino, the master of 3-D pop art. Te Neues Verlag, 1999, 
Julie Maner, Charles Fazzino: Traffic 9 to 5, 24/7 Museum Editions, Ltd, 2004, 
Frank Radice, Vida Radice, Charles Fazzino: Sam Katz on the Loose! Random House Children's Books, 2005, 
Julie Maner, Charles Fazzino: Fazzino's Passport to Our World Museum Editions, Ltd, 2007
Charles Fazzino, Julie Maner: Now Playing on Broadway. Museums Edition Ltd., 2010, 
Julie Maner, Charles Fazzino: O' Beautiful For Spacious Skies. Museums Edition Ltd., 2014, 
Julie Maner, Charles Fazzino: The Sun Shines Bright Over the Big Apple. Museum Editions, Ltd., 2020

Intent 
Fazzino has stated on numerous occasions, and in many ways, that his intent as an artist is to create a body of work that reflects the highlights of popular culture back to his audience: reminding them of who they are, where they come from, and what moves them as human beings. He once wrote "...all of my art is a labor of love for all of you who have enjoyed my work for so long. When we're all gone and many years have passed, I hope that our descendants will look at one of my paintings and say 'that's a Fazzino'. He was that artist who painted those zany pictures of what life was really like back then.'"

References

Sources

CBS Sunday Morning Video

Maner, J (2014). O Beautiful for Spacious Skies, 
Maner, J (2007). Fazzino's Passport to Our World, 
Maner, J (1999). Charles Fazzino: The Master of 3D Pop Art,

External links
 
Fazzino's Blog

1955 births
Living people
20th-century American painters
American male painters
21st-century American painters
People from Shelby County, Alabama
Artists from New Rochelle, New York
American pop artists
American people of Finnish descent
American people of Lithuanian descent
20th-century American male artists